Giorgi Pirtskhalava (born 3 January 1965 in Yangon, Burma) is a retired Georgian professional football player.

See also
Football in Georgia
List of football clubs in Georgia

References

1965 births
Living people
Sportspeople from Yangon
Soviet footballers
Footballers from Georgia (country)
Expatriate footballers from Georgia (country)
Expatriate footballers in Germany
Georgia (country) international footballers
FC Dinamo Tbilisi players
FC Dinamo Batumi players
Association football defenders